Harold M. Walker (1904–1994), was an American animator, who early in his career worked on Mutt and Jeff and Felix the Cat and then on Willard Bowsky's unit with Popeye. In 1962 he created Wellbee, a cartoon character that represented well-being and was used in public health campaigns in the United States.

Biography
Harold M. Walker was born in 1904 in Ossining, New York in 1904 to George Walker. At the age of five, he was injured in a hit and run accident; the incident was reported in The New York Times.

Early in his career he worked on Mutt and Jeff and Felix the Cat and then on Willard Bowsky's unit with Beware of Barnacle Bill and then Popeye. After the release of Walt Disney's sound synchronised Steamboat Willie in 1928, Walker noted "Disney put us out of business with his sound".

In 1962 he created Wellbee, a cartoon character that represented well-being and was used in public health campaigns in the United States.

Gallery

References

1904 births
1994 deaths
People from Ossining, New York
Vaccination advocates